Indianola is the name of two communities in the U.S. state of Oklahoma:

Indianola, Delaware County, Oklahoma, a census-designated place
Indianola, Pittsburg County, Oklahoma, a town